is a professional Japanese baseball player. He plays infielder for the Yokohama DeNA BayStars.

References 

1998 births
Living people
Japanese baseball players
Nippon Professional Baseball infielders
Yokohama DeNA BayStars players
Baseball people from Osaka Prefecture
People from Ibaraki, Osaka